Henry Sibley may refer to:
 Henry Evan Sibley, (1 July 1867 – 20 January 1917), South Australian architect, designer of the pedestal Light's Vision statue in Adelaide (partner in the firm Garlick, Sibley & Wooldridge)
Henry Hastings Sibley (1811–1891), central figure in the founding of Minnesota, first governor, Union general
Henry Hopkins Sibley (1816–1886), Confederate general